Alcyone (or Alcione) was launched in 1810 at Kingston-on-Hull. She spent her career as a merchantman sailing across the Atlantic. She suffered a major grounding in 1824. Circa 1827 Alcyone sailed to India under a licence from the British East India Company (EIC). After her one voyage to India, Alcyone traded to the Baltic and to North and Central America. In 1844–1845 she participated in the guano rush at Ichaboe Island. She was last listed in 1847.

Career
Alcyone was first listed in Lloyd's Register (LR) in 1810. 

{| class=" wikitable"
|-
! Year
! Master
! Owner
! Trade
! Source
|-
| 1810
| Vollans
| Read & Co.
| Hull–Rio de Janeiro
| LR 
|-
| 1812
| J.VollansSimpson
| Read & Co.
| Hull–Rio de JaneiroLondon–Jamaica
| LR
|-
| 1815
| SimpsonE.Davis
| Read & Co.
| London–Jamaica
| LR
|-
| 1816
| SimpsonE.DavisShakespeare
| Read & Co.
| London–Jamaica
| LR
|-
| 1818
| ShakespeareJ.Ranking
| Read & Co.
| London–Jamaica
| LR
|-
| 1819
| J.RankinChapman
| Read & Co.
| Plymouth–West IndiesLondon–Quebec
| LR
|-
| 1823
| Chapman
| Stanes & Co.
| Liverpool–New Brunswick
| '"LR|-
| 1824
| ChapmanT.Mever (Muir?)
| Stanes & Co.W.Reed
| Liverpool–Mrimk (Miramichi?)
| LR|-
| 1825
| T.Mever
| Reed & Co.
| Liverpool–New Brunswick
| LR|-
|}

A report from Liverpool stated that on 25 December 1824 a hurricane from the west drove Alcyone aground as she was coming from St Johns, New Brunswick. Her stern post broke and she filled with water. The weather was shocking, but it was hoped that it would be possible to remove the timber she was carrying between decks. It was expected that in spring every endeavor would be made to get her off. Alcyone was refloated on 7 January 1825 and taken in to Hoylake, Lancashire.

In 1813 the EIC had lost its monopoly on the trade between India and Britain. British ships were then free to sail to India or the Indian Ocean under a licence from the EIC.Alcyone was at Ichaboe to participate in the guano "gold rush". In the early 1840s the Peruvian government had raised its royalty demands on Peruvian guano, the main source of the fertilizer for the United Kingdom. Andrew Livingstone, was a retired master-mariner, living in Liverpool, where he had a school of navigation. In 1842 he read an account published in New York in 1832, by Benjamin Morrell, an American sealing captain, who wrote about having landed at Ichaboe in 1828 and seen massive deposits of guano. Livingstone was eventually able to convince some Liverpool investors to send out a small exploration expedition of three vessels. By 1844 286 British vessels had visited Ichaboe, and in 1845 679 vessels. The guano deposits were quickly exhausted and interest briefly shifted to smaller deposits of lower quality on Malagas Island in Saldanha Bay. Alcyone, Storr, master, was reported on 10 March 1845 to be at Table Bay. She had left Ichaboe 20 February and sailed on to Saldanha Bay on 14 March.

CareerAlcyone'' was last listed in 1847.

Notes, citations, and references
Notes

Citations

References
 
 
 

1810 ships
Age of Sail merchant ships of England
Maritime incidents in December 1825